The 1993–94 Croatian Ice Hockey League season was the third season of the Croatian Ice Hockey League, the top level of ice hockey in Croatia. Four teams participated in the league, and KHL Zagreb won the championship.

Regular season

Playoffs

Semifinals 
 KHL Zagreb – INA Sisak 2:0 (14:3, 25:1)
 KHL Medveščak Zagreb – KHL Mladost Zagreb 2:0 (13:3, 12:4)

3rd place 
 KHL Mladost Zagreb – INA Sisak 2:0 (11:4, 9:2)

Final 
 KHL Zagreb – KHL Medveščak Zagreb 3:2 (6:1, 4:1, 4:5, 2:5, 2:1)

External links
 Season on hockeyarchives.info

Croatian Ice Hockey League
1
Croatian Ice Hockey League seasons